Eugene Sering Acevedo is a Filipino business executive.  He is the President and chief executive officer of Rizal Commercial Banking Corporation (RCBC), 

Previous to this, he held senior leadership positions in three banks. He was president and CEO of Philippine National Bank, Chairman of CitySavings, and managing director with Citibank 

He was born in Cebu City, was raised in Surigao del Sur, and studied at the De La Salle John Bosco College in Bislig, where he graduated high school valedictorian.

Before becoming a banker, Acevedo was a Physics Lecturer at the University of the Philippines - National Institute of Physics.

Acevedo took his master's degree in Business Management at Asian Institute of Management where he was the Javier Nepomuceno Scholar, and had the highest GPA in his class. He also completed the Advanced Management Program at the Harvard Business School.

He graduated BS Physics, magna cum laude, from the University of San Carlos where he was a DOST scholar, National Science and Technology Awardee for Academic Excellence, Student Council Chairman and, later, recipient of the Outstanding Alumnus Award.

Acevedo is keenly interested in banking innovation and transformation. He is also armed with a wide and deep understanding of digital technology and strategy, with certifications from leading global educational institutions. He completed the Blockchain and Artificial Intelligence Programs of MIT, the Oxford Fintech Programme, and the Berkeley Digital Transformation Course. He is a Digital Marketing Professional certified by The Wharton School, has User Experience accreditation from the British Computer Society Chartered Institute of IT and is a qualified Blockchain and Crypto-currency Expert with the Blockchain Council.  He has also completed the Executive Data Science Certification of the Johns Hopkins University.

He is a Fellow of the Institute of Corporate Directors, Trustee of De La Salle John Bosco College, Chairman of the FINEX Financial Inclusion Committee, and starting 2019, an Executive-in-Residence at the Asian Institute of Management.

Current Directorships
Acevedo also serves as Chairman of Rizal Microbank and RCBC Forex Brokers Corporation, Vice Chairman of RCBC Leasing and Finance Corporation, Director of RCBC Rental Corporation, RCBC Capital Corporation, RCBC International Finance Limited and RCBC Investment Limited.

References 

Living people
University of San Carlos alumni
Asian Institute of Management alumni
Filipino chief executives
Filipino chairpersons of corporations
Year of birth missing (living people)